Bruno Brun (1910–1978) was a Yugoslav clarinetist and professor at the Belgrade Music Academy.

Education
Brun was born in Hrastnik, Austro-Hungary, now Slovenia. He graduated from the Belgrade Music Academy in 1945 and continued his education in Paris.

Career and awards
As a soloist, Brun had performed throughout Yugoslavia as well as abroad. He also performed as a principal clarinetist with the Belgrade Philharmonic Orchestra and National Theatre in Belgrade.

He was one of the founders of the Association of Musical Artists of Serbia and its vice-president, and the secretary of the Belgrade Philharmonic Orchestra.

He was awarded "7 July" Prize (1969), the highest state prize for the arts, as well as Decoration of Work.

In 1973 he was a jury member at the ARD International Music Competition in Munich, along with Heinrich Sutermeister (Switzerland), Günter Bialas (Federal Republic of Germany), Ulysse Delécluse (France), David Glazer (United States), Robert Gugolz (Switzerland), Rudolf Jettel (Austria), Jost Michaels (Federal Republic of Germany), Gerd Starke (Federal Republic of Germany).

In 1977 he was a jury member at the Munich Competition, along with Hans-Peter Schmitz (Germany), Eduard Brunner (Switzerland), Hans Deinzer (Federal Republic of Germany), Guy Deplus (France), Dieter Klōcker (Federal Republic of Germany), Victor Petrov (U.S.S.R.) and Heinrich Sutermeister (Switzerland).

Teaching career
Bruno Brun was a professor of clarinet at the Belgrade Music Academy from 1945 to 1975 and a Rector of the University of Arts in Belgrade (1965–1971). His most famous students include Milenko Stefanović, Ernest Ačkun, Ante Grgin and Nikola Srdić (all of them were or are principal clarinetists and university professors). Brun wrote several textbooks for clarinet students.

He died in Belgrade, SFR Yugoslavia, now Serbia.

References

Further reading
Blagojević, Andrija. "Belgrade SAXperience: Internationales Saxophon Festival." 'rohrblatt 34 (2019), Heft 4, pp. 178–179.
Blagojević, Andrija. "The Performance Career of Bruno Brun."  The Clarinet, Vol. 47/3 (June 2020), pp. 34–37.
Blagojević, Andrija. "Centenary of Anton Eberst, clarinetist and author." The Clarinet  Vol. 47/4 (september 2020), p. 8.
Eberst, Anton. Klarinet i klarinetisti. Novi Sad: Forum, 1963.
Eberst, Anton and Milan Čuljak. Šta treba da se zna o duvačkim instrumentima. Novi Sad: Udruženje muzičkih pedagoga, 1958.
Gillespie, James: The International Clarinet Competition of the ARD-Munich, The Clarinet, September 2003
Jugokoncert: 1946-1971, ed. by Milena Milanović.  Belgrade: Yugoslav concert agency, 1971.
Mala enciklopedija Prosveta, I (1978), Prosveta, Belgrade
 Nikolajević, Snežana. Muzika kao događaj. Beograd: Clio, 1994. 
Pedeset godina Fakulteta muzičke umetnosti (Muzičke akademije) 1937-1987. Beograd: Univerzitet umetnosti u Beogradu, 1988.
Peričić, Vlastimir.Muzički stvaraoci u Srbiji. Beograd: Prosveta, [1969]
Stojković, Milica. Bila sam svedok: Muzička produkcija RTB 1976-1992. Beograd: RDU Radio-televizija Srbije, 2011.

External links
Biography
Bruno Brun as a Rector of the University of Arts in Belgrade
Brun's Four Miniatures (complete score  and clarinet part ) free for download from the website of the International Jeunesses Musicales Competition, Retrieved on July 18, 2011

Yugoslav musicians
Serbian classical clarinetists
Academic staff of the University of Arts in Belgrade
University of Arts in Belgrade alumni
Rectors of the University of Arts in Belgrade
1910 births
1978 deaths
20th-century classical musicians